Bhargavacharitham Moonam Khandam is a 2006 Indian Malayalam-language film directed by Jomon starring Mammootty, Sreenivasan and Rahman. The lead characters are inspired by the film Analyze This though the plot is original.

Synopsis 
The plot is inspired by the Harold Ramis-directed classic black comedy Analyze This (1999), with Robert De Niro playing a mafia don who due to frequent bouts of anxiety attacks gets treated by a famous psychiatrist enacted by the great comedy actor Billy Crystal.

Bhargavan is a dreaded underworld don of Kochi but he suffers from anxiety attacks and can neither lift a gun nor beat up anyone. Bhargavan decides to help himself by seeking psychiatric help from Dr Santharam. Santharam is scared of the don and refuses to give him treatment. Bhargavan being desperate, starts living in Santharam's house and starts threatening him.

Meanwhile, the news that Santharam is treating Bhargavan gets out. The real culprit behind Bhargavan is the character played by Sai Kumar who is the head of narcotic cell. He hears the news and tries to kill Santharam. He has to flee and get rescued as a worker in Jumbo Circus which is then playing in Tamil Nadu. But Bhargavan finds his location with the help of Santhara's assistant and goes there. There Santharam reveals that it was Bhargavan's conscience that prevents him from doing bad activities. Santharam encourages him to stop all illegal activities and Bhargavan decides to go against his boss and turn into a good man.

Cast
Mammootty as Current Bhargavan
Sreenivasan as Dr. Shantharam
Rahman as Vinod
Padmapriya as Sophia
Nikita Thukral as Anupama
Sai Kumar as Ramanathan
Kundara Johny as Kannappan 
Mohan Jose as Jabbar
Salim Kumar as Ali
Jagadish as Velayudhan
Shamna Kasim as Radhika
K.P.A.C. Lalitha as Shantharam's Mother
Adithya Menon as Mariyappan

Response
Sify gave this movie 3/5 rating with a verdict of Disappointing, stating that the film would have been a rocking entertainer if the director and the scriptwriter had stuck to the original. WebIndia123 said this is yet another attempt by Mammootty to succeed in comedy, but it leaves us dissatisfied.

References

External links
 

2000s Malayalam-language films
Indian gangster films
Films shot in Kochi
2006 films
2006 comedy films